Alhaji Abubakar Musa is a Nigerian politician who was elected on the National Republican Convention (NRC) platform as Governor of Kebbi State, Nigeria, holding office between January 1992 and November 1993 during the Nigerian Third Republic.

Before entering politics, Musa was Director of  Customs.
Musa was accused of tampering with ballot boxes in the December 1991 elections, but when they took place he was in fact abroad undergoing medical treatment.
In July 1993 he enacted the edict to form the Kebbi State College of Education, now the Adamu Augie College of Education.

In June 2002 he was national treasurer of the newly formed National Democratic Party (NDP).
He was a candidate to be the People's Democratic Party (PDP) for governor in the 2003 elections.
In January 2003 he was at a meeting where Kebbi Governor Muhammad Adamu Aliero announced his intention to run for reelection in April 2003 on the All Nigeria Peoples Party (ANPP) platform.

References

Living people
Governors of Kebbi State
National Republican Convention politicians
National Democratic Party (Nigeria) politicians
Peoples Democratic Party (Nigeria) politicians
Year of birth missing (living people)